Kunchit Senyasaen (born July 12, 1993) is a Thai professional footballer who plays as a forward.

Honours

Club
Ubon UMT United
 Regional League Division 2: 2015

External links
 Kunchit Senyasaen at Supersubthailand

Senyasaen, Kunchit
Senyasaen, Kunchit
Kunchit Senyasaen
Kunchit Senyasaen
Association football forwards
Kunchit Senyasaen
Kunchit Senyasaen
Kunchit Senyasaen
Kunchit Senyasaen